This is a list of compositions by György Ligeti.

Orchestral

Concertos 
 Concert românesc (1951)
 Cello Concerto, for Siegfried Palm (1966)
 Chamber Concerto, for 13 instrumentalists (1969–70)
 Double Concerto, for flute, oboe and orchestra (1972)
 Piano Concerto (1985–88)
 Violin Concerto (1989–93)
 Hamburg Concerto, for horn and chamber orchestra with 4 obbligato natural horns (1998–99, revised 2002)

Works for chamber orchestra 
 Fragment (1961)
 Ramifications (1968–69), for string orchestra or 12 solo strings

Works for full orchestra 
 Apparitions (1958–59)
 Atmosphères (1961)
 Lontano (1967)
 Melodien (1971)
 San Francisco Polyphony (1973–74)

Chamber/Instrumental

Works for string quartet 
 Andante and Allegretto, for string quartet (1950)
 String Quartet No. 1 Métamorphoses nocturnes (1953–54)
 String Quartet No. 2 (1968)

Works for string duet 
 Baladă şi joc (Ballad and Dance), for two violins (1950)
 Hommage à Hilding Rosenberg, for violin and cello (1982)

Sonatas for a solo instrument 
 Sonata for Solo Cello (1948/1953)
 Sonata for Solo Viola (1991–94)

Works for wind quintet 
 Six Bagatelles for Wind Quintet (1953)
 Ten Pieces for Wind Quintet (1968)

Others 
 Trio for Violin, Horn and Piano (1982)
 The Big Turtle Fanfare from the South China Sea, for trumpet (1985)

Keyboard

Works for solo piano 
 Four Early Piano Pieces: Basso Ostinato (1941)
 Due capricci (1947)
 Invention (1948)
 Musica ricercata (1951–53)
 Chromatische Phantasie (1956)
 Trois Bagatelles, for David Tudor (1961)
 Études pour piano, Book 1, six etudes (1985)
 Études pour piano, Book 2, eight etudes (1988–94)
 L'arrache-coeur (1994)
 Études pour piano, Book 3, four etudes (1995–2001)

Works for piano four-hands 
 Induló (March) (1942)
 Polifón etüd (Polyphonic Étude) (1943)
 Allegro (1943)
 Három lakodalmi tánc (Three Wedding Dances) (1950)
 Sonatina (1950)

Works for two pianos 
 Three Pieces for Two Pianos – Monument – Selbstporträt – Bewegung (1976)

Works for harpsichord 
 Continuum (1968)
 Passacaglia ungherese (1978)
 Hungarian Rock (Chaconne) (1978)

Works for organ 
 Ricercare – Omaggio a Girolamo Frescobaldi (1953)
 Volumina (1961–62, revised 1966)
 Two Studies for Organ:
 Harmonies (1967)
 Coulée (1969)

Adaptations for player piano 
 From Études pour piano, Book 2:
 No. VII: Galamb borong (1988) (adapted for two Player Pianos)
 No. IX: Vertige (1990)
 No. X: Der Zauberlehrling (1994)
 No. XI: En suspens (1994)
 No. XIII: L'escalier du diable (1993)
 No. XIVa: Coloana fără sfârşit (original version for Player Piano) (1993)
 Continuum (1970) (adapted for two Player Pianos)

Adaptations for barrel organ 
 Capriccio nº 1 & nº 2 (1947)
 Invention (1948)
 Continuum (1970)
 Hungarian Rock (Chaconne) (1978)

Vocal

Works for chorus 
 Idegen földön (Far from home) (1945–46)
 Betlehemi királyok (Kings of Bethlehem) (1946)
 Húsvét (Easter) (1946)
 Magos Kősziklának (From the high rocks) (1946)
 Magány (Solitude) (1946)
 Bujdosó (The fugitive)  (1946)
 Két kánon
 Ha folyóvíz volnék (1947)
 Pletykázó asszonyok (1952)
 Lakodalmas (Wedding dance) (1950)
 Hortobágy (1951)
 Haj, ifjuság! (Hey, youth!) (1951)
 Kállai kettős (1952)
 Inaktelki nóták (Tunes from Inaktelk) (1953)
 [[Pápainé|Pápainé (Widow Pápai)]] (1953)
 Mátraszentimrei dalok (Songs from Mátraszentimre) (1955)
 Éjszaka – Reggel (Night, morning) (1955)
 Lux Aeterna (1966)
 Three Fantasies after Friedrich Hölderlin (1982)
 Magyar Etüdök, for 16 voices after Sándor Weöres (1983)
 Nonsense madrigals, for 6 male voices (1988–93), partly on poems by Lewis Carroll. The Alphabet was written for The King's Singers.

Songs 
 Három Weöres-dal (Three Weöres Songs), voice and piano (1946–47)
 Négy lakodalmi tánc (Four Wedding Dances, adaptions of Hungarian folk songs), three voices or female choir (SMezA) and piano (1950)
 Öt Arany-dal (Five Arany Songs), voice and piano (1952)
 Der Sommer, voice and piano (1989)
 Síppal, dobbal, nádihegedűvel (With Pipes, Drums, Fiddles) (2000)

Works for instrumentalists and singers 
 Aventures (1962)
 Nouvelles Aventures (1962–65)
 Requiem, for soprano and mezzo-soprano solo, mixed chorus and orchestra (1963–65)
 Clocks and Clouds, for 12 female voices and orchestra (1973)

Opera 
 Le Grand Macabre (1975–77, second version 1996)

Electronic 
 Glissandi (1957)
 Artikulation (1958)
 Pièce électronique no. 3 (1957–58, not realized until 1996)
 Rondeau, One-man theatre for an actor and tape (1976)

Miscellaneous 
 Poème Symphonique, for 100 metronomes (1962)

External links 

www.gyorgy-ligeti.com: Official Site with complete catalogue and list of performances

Ligeti